William Overend (1809 – 24 December 1884) was a British Conservative politician.

After unsuccessful standing for election at Sheffield in 1852 and 1857, Overend was first elected Conservative MP for Pontefract in 1859. However, he resigned later that year by becoming the Steward of the Manor of Hempholme.

References

External links
 

1809 births
1884 deaths
Conservative Party (UK) MPs for English constituencies
UK MPs 1859–1865